Mamanasco Lake is a census-designated place (CDP) in the town of Ridgefield, Fairfield County, Connecticut, United States. It is northwest of the center of Ridgefield and surrounds a lake of the same name.

Mamanasco Lake was first listed as a CDP prior to the 2020 census.

References 

Census-designated places in Fairfield County, Connecticut
Census-designated places in Connecticut